Team PNoy, formerly known as the LP–Akbayan–NPC–NP–LDP Coalition, was a political umbrella coalition in the Philippines, originally formed to support the administration-backed senatorial line-up for the 2013 Philippine Senate election. Team PNoy is composed mostly of supporters of former President Benigno Aquino III (President Noynoy, or PNoy). The coalition is composed of the Liberal Party, the Nacionalista Party, the Nationalist People's Coalition, the Laban ng Demokratikong Pilipino, the Akbayan Citizens' Action Party, the PDP–Laban and the National Unity Party.

History

2013 elections 
The Liberal Party (LP) was open to creating coalitions or alliances with other parties for the 2013 general election as long as the politicians had aligning principles. Secretary of Budget and Management Florencio Abad said on April 7, 2012 that it was too early to make conclusions. Two days later, the Liberals revealed 14 names as potential candidates on their ticket, including candidates that were being considered on the United Nationalist Alliance (UNA) ticket, which meant there were common names on both tickets.

In April 2012, the Nacionalista Party (NP) was choosing between the LP and the UNA tickets, with party Secretary-General Alan Peter Cayetano saying that it was too early to decide on such matters. The verdict in the impeachment of Renato Corona could affect their decision.

On May 17, 2012, Aquino revealed the party's four certain senatorial bets, namely Aurora Representative Sonny Angara, TESDA chairman Joel Villanueva and 2010 senatorial candidates Risa Hontiveros and Ruffy Biazon. All four, were still considering their options to run for Senator. On 28 June 2012, party vice chairman Senator Franklin Drilon announced the candidacy of former Senator Ramon Magsaysay Jr.

Senator Francis Escudero, who formerly campaigned for the Nationalist People's Coalition (NPC)'s presidential nomination in 2010 before resigning from the party and withdrawing from the race abruptly, said he believed that the NPC and the Liberals "are in coalition with one another".

It was announced on July 5, 2012 that the ruling LP, the NPC and the NP would most likely field a common senatorial ticket in the May 2013 elections. A meeting between Noynoy Aquino and Manuel Villar resulted in an agreement to coalesce for the 2013 elections and details such as local candidates would be dealt with upon on further meetings. Senator and LP vice chairman Franklin Drilon cautioned that the agreement was "not yet sealed" as the distribution of slots in the ticket would also be a factor. The NP had already endorsed four candidates in Senators Antonio Trillanes and Alan Peter Cayetano and Representatives Robert "Ace" Barbers and Cynthia Villar.

However, NPC official and Senator Tito Sotto in September said that the three-party coalition might not be pursued as the determination of candidates at the local level remained a stumbling block in the formation of the coalition. The NPC had more local officials than the LP and the NP. Meanwhile, Representative Mark Villar of the NP said that they would stay put with their coalition agreement with the LP and that most issues had already been resolved.

The President's cousin Bam Aquino and Jamby Madrigal, one of the defeated presidential candidates in 2010, were sworn in as LP members. On 1 October 2012, the President announced the administration coalition's nominees in a speech at Club Filipino. The ruling coalition, aside from the LP, the NPC and the NP, included the Laban ng Demokratikong Pilipino (LDP) and Akbayan.

In October 2012, Senators Francis Escudero, Loren Legarda and Fernando Poe Jr.'s daughter, former MTRCB Chair Grace Poe, formally joined the proclamation rally as independent candidates. The three independent candidates were also adopted by the UNA coalition.

According to Joseph Emilio Abaya, the ruling party's spokesman, the independent candidates did not intend to campaign with the UNA, which had also adopted them. However, when asked with whom she will campaign, Legarda said: "I will campaign with the Filipino people".

On January 26, 2013, it was announced that the administration ticket would be called Team PNoy. It is a play on the words pinoy, (an informal term used to denote the Filipino people) and P-Noy, the administration's preferred reference to President Aquino, whose nickname is Noynoy. Angara said that "we decided to use 'PNoy' to send the message that this campaign is for all Filipinos". The coalition released its first TV advertisement the next day with the Team PNoy spelling.

2016 elections 

A few days after his final State of the Nation Address, President Aquino endorsed Secretary of the Interior Mar Roxas as the standard bearer of his administration in the 2016 general election.

Coalition members

Mainstream party members 
 Liberal Party (LP)
 Laban ng Demokratikong Pilipino (LDP)
 Nationalist People's Coalition (NPC-Legarda wing)
 Nacionalista Party (NP-Villar wing)
 National Unity Party (NUP-Barzaga wing)
 Akbayan Citizens' Action Party (Akbayan)
 Partido Demokratiko Pilipino-Lakas ng Bayan (PDP-Laban) (PDP-Laban Pimentel wing)

Senatorial slate

Election results 
9 out of 12 candidates won the possible 12 seats in the Senate:
 Sonny Angara
 Bam Aquino
 Alan Peter Cayetano
 Francis Escudero
 Loren Legarda
 Koko Pimentel
 Grace Poe
 Antonio Trillanes
 Cynthia Villar

See also 
 Elections in the Philippines
 Partido Galing at Puso, the main rival of Team PNoy in the 2016 elections
 United Nationalist Alliance, the main rival of Team PNoy in the 2013 elections
 Otso Diretso

References

External links 
 
 

Defunct political party alliances in the Philippines
2012 establishments in the Philippines
2015 disestablishments in the Philippines
2013 elections in the Philippines
Presidency of Benigno Aquino III